Lago di Recentino is a lake in the Province of Terni, Umbria, Italy.

Lakes of Umbria